The Roman Catholic Diocese of Fez was a short-lived (c. 1225 – 1237) Roman Catholic diocese in Fez, Morocco.

History 
The Diocese of Fez (Fes, Fecen(sis) or Fessen(sis)) was a Latin Rite diocese established around 1225 in the territory of modern Morocco, without direct predecessor.

Its only resident incumbent Ordinary was :
Suffragan? Bishop Agnello (1225 – 1237.06.12), later Bishop of Marocco (Marrakech) (1237.06.12 – ?)

Suppressed circa 1237, its territory being merged into the Diocese of Marocco (at Marrakech, also in present Morocco), to which its incumbent bishop Agnello was appointed.

Titular see 
Circa 1496 the diocese was nominally restored as Latin Titular bishopric of Fez / Fes / Fecen(sis) = Fessen(sis) (Latin), of the Episcopal (lowest) rank.

Circa 1730 it was however again suppressed even as titular see, having had the following incumbents, all of the fitting episcopal rank :
 Teotónio de Bragança, Jesuits (S.J.) (1578.07.04 – 1578.12.07) as Coadjutor Archbishop of Évora (Portugal) (1578.06.28 – 1578.12.07); succeeded as Metropolitan Archbishop of Évora (1578.12.07 – death 1602.07.24)
 Jorge Queimado, Augustinians (O.E.S.A.) (1599.02.01 – ?death) as Auxiliary Bishop of Braga (Portugal) (1599.02.01 – ?)
 Manuel dos Anjos, Observant? Friars Minor (O.F.M. Obs.) (1621.11.15 – death 1634.10.28) as Auxiliary Bishop of above Évora (Portugal) (1621.11.15 – 1634.10.28)
 Gabriel ab Annuntiatione, Secular Canons of Saint John (C.R.S.J.E.) (1640.03.26 – death 1644.03.18) as Auxiliary Bishop of above Évora (Portugal) (1640.03.26 – 1644.03.18)
 Stanislaus Giannotti, Canons Regular of Saint Augustine (C.R.S.A.) (1659.12.01 – death 1681) as Auxiliary Bishop of then Archdiocese of Kyiv–Černihiv (now Kyïv–Žytomyr, Ukraine) (1659.12.01 – 1681)

See also 
 List of Catholic dioceses in Morocco, Mauretania and Western Sahara

Sources and external links 
 GCatholic

Catholic titular sees in Africa
suppressed Roman Catholic dioceses